Spyridon Athanasopoulos was a Greek gymnast.  He competed at the 1896 Summer Olympics in Athens.

Athanasopoulos was the team leader of the Panellinios Gymnastikos Syllogos team that placed second of the three teams in the event, giving him a silver medal.

References
 profile

External links

Year of birth missing
Year of death missing
Gymnasts at the 1896 Summer Olympics
19th-century sportsmen
Greek male artistic gymnasts
Olympic gymnasts of Greece
Olympic silver medalists for Greece
Olympic medalists in gymnastics
Medalists at the 1896 Summer Olympics